This article details the Bradford Bulls rugby league football club's 2000 season, the 5th season of the Super League era.

Season review

February 2000

Bradford kicked off the 2000 season with a 32–4 win over Huddersfield Giants in the 4th Round of the Challenge Cup, the Bulls followed this win up by smashing Wakefield Trinity Wildcats 46–0 in the 5th Round.

March 2000

The Bulls started Super League V with a 32–10 win over premiership winners St. Helens at Knowsley Road. Bradford's quest to become cup winners continued with a hard fought 28–18 win against Halifax. The Bulls resumed their defence of the Super League League Leader's Shield with a 58–4 win against Warrington Wolves. Warrington Wolves were once again on the end of a defeat as the Bulls beat them the following week 44–10 in the semi final of the Challenge Cup.

April 2000

Bradford continued their great run of form with an astounding performance to beat Huddersfield Giants 60–2 at the McAlpine Stadium, the star of the game being Henry Paul who was immaculate with the boot kicking 10 goals. The backed this performance up at home with a 44–12 win against Castleford Tigers. Salford City Reds were the next team to suffer defeat at the hands of Bradford going down 52–1 at The Willows. The week before the Challenge Cup Final the Bulls hosted London Broncos, the Bulls won the game 32–12. Bradford travelled up to Scotland for the Challenge Cup Final against arch rivals Leeds Rhinos. After a hard fought game the Bulls came out 24–18 winners after Nathan McAvoy scored an outstanding individual try to give Bradford the win and their 4th Challenge Cup (1st since Super League began).

May 2000

The first game of May for Bradford was against Hull FC, both sides shared the points as the game ended in an 8–8 draw. The Bulls got back to winning ways as they beat Wakefield Trinity Wildcats 44–16. The next week they demolished a poor Halifax Blue Sox 62–2 with Justin Brooker grabbing a hat-trick. Leeds Rhinos were next up for the Bulls, Bradford expected a hard match after they beat Leeds in the Challenge Cup Final however the Bulls ran rampant and won the game 44–2. Their first loss of the season came against Warrington Wolves as the Wolves claimed a 42–32 win over Bradford.

June 2000

Bradford started June with two hard games against St Helens R.F.C. and Wigan Warriors. The Bulls managed to sneak a 17–16 win against the Saints thanks to a Paul Deacon drop goal. The points were shared at the JJB Stadium as Henry Paul's goal kicked helped the Bulls to draw 12–12. The hard start ended with the visit of Huddersfield Giants, Bradford dispatched the Giants 48–20 with Tevita Vaikona grabbing a hat-trick. They backed up this win with a 39–10 win at Castleford Tigers. The Bulls set a Super League record as they embarrassed Salford City Reds at Odsal Stadium, the Paul brothers were the star players with Robbie scoring 4 tries and Henry scoring a try and kicking 14 goals in the 96–16 win. Bradford finished a tough month with a 30–18 loss to Wigan Warriors.

July 2000

Bradford had a close 24–16 victory against London Broncos to get over their loss to Wigan the previous month. The Bulls soon got back to playing quality rugby as they took Hull F.C. apart and beat the 56–6 at Odsal before grinding out a 30–20 win against Wakefield Trinity Wildcats the following week. However they once again finished a month with a loss as arch-rivals Leeds Rhinos took the points by winning 28–26 in front of at 21,237 crowd at Odsal Stadium.

August 2000

Bradford drew 20–20 against Halifax Blue Sox at the new The Shay to start August. They backed this draw up with a convincing 28–8 win against Castleford Tigers, this gave the Bulls some confidence and it showed as they destroyed Huddersfield Giants 52–20 the following week. Wigan Warriors beat the Bulls 20–19 at Odsal Stadium which killed off Bradford's hopes of finishing top of the league.

September 2000

The Bulls started September with a hard fought 25–18 win over Halifax Blue Sox, a late Paul Deacon drop goal secured the points for Bradford. They also got revenge over rivals Leeds Rhinos as a Henry Paul penalty ensured the Bulls won 14–12. However they finished the season on a low as an under strength Bradford side lost 25–12 to Hull F.C. which ensured that Bradford finished 3rd in the league. The Bulls lost the Qualifying Play-off game 16–11 to St Helens R.F.C., a very late Chris Joynt try (the infamous Wide to West play) ensures Saints won the match. Bradford got back on track as they beat Leeds Rhinos 46–12 in the Elimination Semi-final.

October 2000

Bradford's season ended in the Final Eliminator as they lost 40–12 against Wigan Warriors.

2000 milestones

CCR5: Michael Withers scored his 3rd hat-trick and reached 100 points for the Bulls.
CCR5: Brad Mackay and Hudson Smith scored their 1st tries for the Bulls.
Round 2: Justin Brooker scored his 1st try for the Bulls.
Round 2: Nathan McAvoy scored his 25th try and reached 100 points for the Bulls.
Round 3: Henry Paul reached 200 points for the Bulls.
Round 6: Stuart Spruce scored his 50th try and reached 200 points for the Bulls.
Round 9: Justin Brooker scored his 1st hat-trick for the Bulls.
Round 9: Mike Forshaw scored his 25th try and reached 100 points for the Bulls.
Round 9: Henry Paul kicked his 100th goal for the Bulls.
Round 11: Henry Paul reached 300 points for the Bulls.
Round 14: Tevita Vaikona scored his 2nd hat-trick for the Bulls.
Round 14: Paul Sykes scored his 1st try for the Bulls.
Round 16: Rob Parker, Lee Radford and Alex Wilkinson all scored their 1st tries for the Bulls.
Round 16: Robbie Paul scored his 1st four-try haul and his 6th hat-trick for the Bulls.
Round 16: Jamie Peacock scored his 1st hat-trick for the Bulls.
Round 19: Henry Paul reached 400 points for the Bulls.
Round 24: Paul Deacon reached 200 points for the Bulls.
Round 25: Scott Naylor scored his 25th try and reached 100 points for the Bulls.
Round 28: Gareth Stanley scored his 1st try for the Bulls.
Qualifying Play-off: Henry Paul kicked his 200th goal for the Bulls.
Elimination Semi-final: Henry Paul reached 500 points for the Bulls.

Table

2000 Fixtures and results

2000 Tetley's Bitter Super League

Challenge Cup

Playoffs

2000 squad statistics

 Appearances and Points include (Super League, Challenge Cup and Play-offs) as of 2012.

References

External links
Bradford Bulls Website
Bradford Bulls in T&A
Bradford Bulls on Sky Sports
Bradford on Super League Site
Red,Black And Amber
BBC Sport-Rugby League 

Bradford Bulls seasons
Bradford Bulls